Lindholmemydidae is an extinct family of turtles in the Testudinoidea.

Genera
Amuremys
Elkemys
Gravemys
Hongilemys
Khodzhakulemys
Mongolemys
Paragravemys
Paramongolemys
Shandongemys

References

Testudinoidea
Extinct turtles